Wilhelm Flenner (10 November 1922 – February 1995) was an Austrian weightlifter. He competed in the men's light heavyweight event at the 1952 Summer Olympics.

References

1922 births
1995 deaths
Austrian male weightlifters
Olympic weightlifters of Austria
Weightlifters at the 1952 Summer Olympics
Place of birth missing
20th-century Austrian people